Altice Studio is a French Premium pay television channel dedicated to movies and series operated by Altice France.

The channel launched on 22 August 2017 as part of the company new strategy to provide to their subscribers their own television channel, like their competitor Orange S.A. with the OCS channels.

Altice Studio is available exclusively on SFR, and Canal+ since 2020. Its subscribers have the option to subscribe to Altice Studio.

Most of the Altice Studio programmes were also available on SFR Play, the subscription video on demand service owned by SFR, until 30 June 2020 when the service became only for kids.

History
On 17 May 2017, Alain Weill announced the launch of a television channel named SFR Studio.

On 11 July 2017, the group announced that the channel name will be Altice Studio and revealed an exclusive contract with NBCUniversal and Paramount Pictures.

In November 2017, SFR Sat packages were launched on Fransat with 3 offers: SFR Play, SFR Sport and Altice Studio. SFR Play and Altice Studio were removed of Fransat on 1 November 2019, but RMC Sport kept available.

On 18 August 2020, Altice Studio was added to Canal+, as an option for 5€.

On March 6, 2023, the channel will be closed on March 22, 2023 due to competitions like Netflix, Amazon Prime and Disney+.

Series
 Absentia
 Almost Family
 Betoolot (Sirènes)
 Inhumans
 Last Flight
 Medici: Masters of Florence  (Les Médicis : Maîtres de Florence)
 Riviera
 The Same Sky
 The Sinner
 Taken 
 Victoria
 Britannia

References

External links
 Official website

Television stations in France
Television channels and stations established in 2017
Altice France